Somethin' Smith and the Redheads were an American vocal group, doing mostly pop standards in the 1950s. Their biggest hit single was "It's a Sin to Tell a Lie" in 1955, which reached #7 in the Billboard Hot 100 chart. The following year they reached #27 with their cover version of "In a Shanty in Old Shanty Town". Both releases were issued on the Epic Records label.

The group consisted of Smith (Robert H. (Red) Robinson; vocals, banjo, and guitar), Saul Striks (December 8, 1924 – c. December 1979; piano) and Major Short (June 22, 1924 – March 30, 2018; double bass).

Minor chart records included "Heartaches", "Ace In The Hole", and "You Always Hurt The One You Love". In 1961, they recorded their final album for the MGM label, which also resulted in one final single being released from the album.

The trio parted ways in 1966. Saul Striks began a new group called the Saloonatics with himself on piano and Ralph J. Guenther on bass and banjo.

Striks died from a heart attack in December 1979 at either 54 or 55 years old. Robinson is also dead.

Short lived in Hilton Head Island, South Carolina, where he got into the banjo hall of fame, until he died on March 30, 2018, at the age of 93.

References

American vocal groups